Agostino Barbarigo (January 22, 1516 – October 9, 1571) was a Venetian nobleman who served numerous administrative and military assignments for Venice, including Venetian Ambassador in France (1554-1557).

Career and early life 
Barbarigo was a Venetian noble of the Barbarigo family.

In 1567 Barbarigo was elected lieutenant of Cyprus but opted 2 months later for a different post.

Lepanto 
As an experienced commander and second in command of the Venetian contingent, he led the Christian left wing, during the Battle of Lepanto. Although his galleys were victorious, he was mortally wounded by an arrow in the eye. The leader of the Turkish right wing and Barbarigo's tactical opponent, Mehmed Siroco, was also killed in the battle.

See also
 Battle of Lepanto order of battle

Sources

1518 births
1571 deaths
Agostino
Battle of Lepanto
Deaths by arrow wounds
Republic of Venice admirals
Republic of Venice military personnel killed in action